Balanops is a group of flowering plants described as a genus in 1871. The nine species are trees or shrubs, found in New Caledonia, Fiji, Vanuatu, and northern Queensland. They are dioecious, with separate male and female plants.

The genus by itself constitutes the family Balanopaceae (formerly the spelling Balanopsidaceae was also used). It is placed in the order Malpighiales and is related to Chrysobalanaceae, Dichapetalaceae, Euphroniaceae and Trigoniaceae.

Species
 Balanops australiana - Queensland 
 Balanops balansae - New Caledonia  
 Balanops microstachya - New Caledonia  
 Balanops oliviformis - New Caledonia  
 Balanops pachyphylla - New Caledonia  
 Balanops pancheri - New Caledonia  
 Balanops pedicellata - Vanuatu, Fiji 
 Balanops sparsifolia - New Caledonia  
 Balanops vieillardii-  New Caledonia

References

 
Malpighiales genera
Taxa named by Henri Ernest Baillon
Dioecious plants